Arabo or Arapo (1863–1893), born Arakel Mkhitarian, was an Armenian fedayi of the late 19th century. 

Arabo was born in the village of Kurter or Korter ( or ) in the region of Sasun in the Bitlis vilayet. Arabo studied at the Arakelots Monastery school in Mush. Beginning in the late-1880s, he led the Armenian fedayi groups in Sasun and Taron. According to Armenian revolutionary Ruben Ter Minasian, Arabo started off as a bandit whose group "terrorized the environs of the City of Moush, blocked the roads, staged holdups, killed and robbed, seized entire flocks of sheep and cattle", but became a revolutionary during his time in the Caucasus. 

Starting in 1889, Arabo visited the Caucasus several times. In 1892, he was arrested by Turkish authorities and sentenced to 15 years of imprisonment, but escaped from prison and resumed his fedayi activities. He took part in the first ARF conference in Tiflis in 1892. In spring of 1893, while returning to Ottoman Armenia from the Caucasus to help rebels from Sasun, he was killed with his four comrades during a battle with Kurdish bands on the road from Khnus to Mush.

See also
 "Zartir lao", a popular folk song about Arabo
 Armenian fedayi
 Armenian national movement

References

External links
Arabo's Biography 

1863 births
1893 deaths
People from Bitlis
Armenian fedayi
Armenian nationalists
Prisoners and detainees of the Ottoman Empire
Armenians from the Ottoman Empire
Highwaymen